Pt. Ram Lakhan Shukla Rajkeey Post Graduate College Alapur is a postgraduate government college. M.A., B.A., B.Com., and Bsc. classes are available. The government college affiliates to the Dr. Ram Manohar Lohia Avadh University Faizabad, India, since 1994.

The foundation stone of the building was done by the then Governor Mr. Moti Lal Bora on 6 September 1994.

External links
http://prlsgpgc.org/

Postgraduate colleges in Uttar Pradesh
Colleges of Dr. Ram Manohar Lohia Awadh University
Colleges in Ambedkar Nagar district